Lowell Rose (born March 11, 1990) is an American football cornerback who is currently a free agent. He signed with the San Francisco 49ers as undrafted free agent in 2013. He played college football at Tulsa.

Early years
He attended Culver City High School where he was a three-year letterman. He selected to the All-Ocean League first-team in his senior season in high school.

College career
On December 4, 2012, he was named as an honorable mention for the C-USA All-Conference Team following his senior season.

Professional career

San Francisco 49ers
On May 5, 2013, he signed with the San Francisco 49ers as an undrafted free agent. On July 23, 2013, he re-signed with the San Francisco 49ers after being released earlier in the offseason.

Spokane Shock
On December 17, 2013, Rose was assigned to the Spokane Shock of the Arena Football League (AFL). After taking parts of 2014 with 3 NFL teams, Rose was activated by the Shock from the Other League Exempt list on December 2, 2014.

New York Jets
Rose was signed by the New York Jets on January 9, 2014. He was released on July 23, 2014.

San Diego Chargers
On August 1, 2014, Rose signed with the San Diego Chargers. The Chargers released Rose on August 25, 2014.

Miami Dolphins
Rose signed to the Dolphins practice squad after his Chargers release. On October 18, 2014, he was promoted to their 53-man roster. He played 13 snaps covering Broncos WR Demaryius Thomas in their Week 12 31-28 loss at Denver, limiting DeMaryius to 1 reception for 4 yards in Rose's coverage. He was waived on November 29, 2014, to make room for Don Jones. He was re-signed to the Dolphins practice squad after clearing waivers.

Second stint with San Diego
On June 1, 2015, Rose signed with the San Diego Chargers.

Los Angeles KISS
On October 16, 2015, Rose was assigned to the Los Angeles KISS.

References

External links
San Diego Chargers bio
San Francisco 49ers bio
Tulsa Golden Hurricane bio

1990 births
Living people
American football cornerbacks
Tulsa Golden Hurricane football players
San Francisco 49ers players
Spokane Shock players
New York Jets players
San Diego Chargers players
Miami Dolphins players
Los Angeles Kiss players